PL. Thenappan is an Indian film producer and actor who works predominantly in the Tamil film industry. He owns the production company Shree Rajalakshmi Films (P) Ltd. He debuted as a producer with the Tamil film Kaathala Kaathala (1998).

He is a producer known for making big budget films and at the same time promotes encouraging fresh talents as well.

Career

Filmography

Films as producer

Films as co-producer

Films as Actor

Films as production executive

Films as production manager

Short film corner
Apart from mainstream cinema, Thenappan has produced two short films in French, which were screened at the prestigious Cannes Film Festival in France.

References

External links 

Living people
Film producers from Chennai
Tamil film producers
Year of birth missing (living people)